The  Atlanta Falcons season was the franchise's 29th season in the National Football League (NFL).

Under head coach June Jones, the Falcons' run and shoot offense was heavily imbalanced in 1994, in favor of the passing game. Atlanta's passing yardage–4,112 yards—was third in the NFC, and fifth in the league overall; but their rushing yards (1,249, 78.1 yards per game) were dead-last in the league. They had, by far, the fewest rushing attempts in the league in 1994, with only 330 all year.

The Falcons were 4-2 in the first six games, but their season was effectively ruined by going 3-7 afterwards.

Offseason

NFL draft

Personnel

Staff

Roster

Regular season

Schedule

Standings

Awards and records
 Terance Mathis, Franchise Record, Most Receptions in One Season, 111 Receptions

References

External links
 1994 Atlanta Falcons at Pro-Football-Reference.com

Atlanta Falcons
Atlanta Falcons seasons
Atlanta